Sanganagouda Basanagouda Patil (23 November 1925 – 20 December 2001) was an Indian politician who was a member of Lok Sabha for Bijapur South in the then state of Mysore.

Life and career
Patil was born in Sunag, Bijapur district on 23 November 1925. 

Patil was a member of 3rd Lok Sabha from Bijapur South in the then state Mysore. He was elected to 4th, 5th and 6th Lok Sabha from Bagalkot constituency in the state of Karnataka.

Patil died in Bagalkot on 20 December 2001, at the age of 76.

References

1925 births
2001 deaths
People from Bijapur district, Karnataka
India MPs 1962–1967
India MPs 1967–1970
India MPs 1971–1977
India MPs 1977–1979
People from Bagalkot district
Karnataka politicians
Lok Sabha members from Karnataka
Indian National Congress politicians from Karnataka